The following highways are numbered 340:

Canada
Manitoba Provincial Road 340
 New Brunswick Route 340
Newfoundland and Labrador Route 340
 Nova Scotia Route 340
Prince Edward Island Route 340
 Quebec Route 340
Saskatchewan Highway 340

India
 National Highway 340 (India)

Japan
 Japan National Route 340

Norway

United States
  U.S. Route 340
  Arkansas Highway 340
  Colorado State Highway 340
  Georgia State Route 340 (former)
 Hawaii Route 340
  Indiana State Road 340
  Missouri Route 340
  Nevada State Route 340
  New York State Route 340
  Ohio State Route 340
  Pennsylvania Route 340
 Texas:
  Texas State Highway 340 (former)
  Texas State Highway Loop 340
  Wyoming Highway 340